The Boankra Inland Port is an Inland port-Dry port  near the Ghanaian city of Kumasi.

Timeline 
 2008 - project stalled in 2008 and is to be completed in 2015.

See also 
 Transport in Ghana
 Ghana Railway Corporation

References 

Dry ports
Buildings and structures in Kumasi
Ports and harbours of Ghana
Road transport in Ghana